Malik Deenar College of Pharmacy is a professional college in Kasaragod, Kerala, India.

History
The Malik Deenar College of Pharmacy(MDCP) was established in the year 2004, under the leadership of its founding Chairman Late Janab K.S. Abdullah. It is located in Kasaragod district, a small district of Kerala.

Janab K.S. Abdullah was one of the few philanthropists Kasaragod has ever seen. He was known for his charity works, including the establishment of Kasaragod Muslim Welfare Association(KMWA) in 1973. There are many other institutions and establishments (including Malik Deenar Charitable Hospital, Nursing College etc at Thalangara).

Malik Deenar College of Pharmacy(MDCP) has a history before its actual birth in 2004.

KMWA broke new grounds in the field of pharmacy education by setting up a Diploma in Pharmacy program in the year 1993. The college for D.Pharm was initially located at Thalangara, the heart of the district. When the plans got widened the location had to be widened that's how in 2004 a new Pharmacy institution rose in the outskirts of Kasaragod, a beautiful scenic place 'Seethangoli'. A 15 km drive from the heart of the town would lead to Seethangoli. Seethangoli is known for HAL, KINFRA and other industrial and non-industrial facilities.

MDCP was affiliated to Kannur University which was later transferred to Kerala University of Health Sciences (KUHS), Trissur. It is also approved by Pharmacy Council of India(PCI), New Delhi and Govt. Of Kerala.

Courses offered
 Courses After Plus Two/12th:
  B.Pharm/B.Pharma (Bachelor of Pharmacy): 60 Seats (30 Government merit & 30 Management merit)
  D.Pharm/D.Pharma (Diploma in Pharmacy): 60 Seats (30 Government merit & 30 Management merit)
 Course After B.Pharm/B.Pharma:
  M.Pharm/M.Pharma (Master of Pharmacy): 6 Seats (3 Government merit & 3 Management merit)

References

Colleges affiliated to Kannur University
Seethangoli
Colleges in Kasaragod district
Pharmacy education
Colleges in Kerala
Pharmacy schools in India
Pharmacy education in India